Königs Wusterhausen is a town in the Dahme-Spreewald district of the state of Brandenburg in Germany a few kilometers outside Berlin.

Geography

Geographical location
Königs Wusterhausen – locally known as "KW" or "KWh"– lies on the Notte canal and the river Dahme southeast of Berlin. Much further away to the west lies the state capital Potsdam.

The abbreviation "KW" is also a reminder of the Königs Wusterhausen radio transmitter as "KW" is also the abbreviation for "Kilowatt" and "Kurzwelle" (German: "Shortwave")

Parts of town

Königs Wusterhausen is the biggest town in the Dahme-Spreewald district. The municipal reforms in 2003 brought about seven amalgamations, since which time the communities of Zeesen, Kablow, Diepensee, Niederlehme, Senzig, Wernsdorf and Zernsdorf have belonged to Königs Wusterhausen, the town's land area has grown sixfold, and its population has doubled.

Demography

History
In 1320, in connection with an investiture on 19 September, the place ("hus to wosterhusen") and the castle got their first known documentary mention. By 1400, the two were both a fiefdom held by the noble family of Schlieben. In 1500 the estate of Wendisch Wusterhausen was verified for the first time by the Schenken (a noble title) of Landberg zu Teupitz.

On 14 October 1669 Privy Councillor Friedrich von Jena acquired the castle and the village of Wendisch Wusterhausen. In early July 1683, Kurprinz Friedrich, later (1688) Elector Friedrich III, and later still (1701) King Frederick I of Prussia, acquired the castle and the village. In 1698, Kurprinz Friedrich Wilhelm was given the castle along with the attached estate as a gift by his father. In 1707, the Crown Prince and later King Frederick William I in Prussia founded his Company, the "Potsdam Giants". Between 1713 and 1718, the castle was remodelled as a hunting lodge, which his son Frederick II (Frederick the Great) despised. In 1718, the town, hitherto known as Wusterhausen, was given its current name, Königs Wusterhausen ("Königs" = "king's" in German).

In 1862, novelist and poet Theodor Fontane visited Königs Wusterhausen for his Wanderungen durch die Mark Brandenburg.

Since 1901, Königs Wusterhausen has been home to the Brandenburg School for the Blind and Visually Impaired (Brandenburgische Schule für Blinde und Sehbehinderte), endowed by the Hamburg merchant Hermann Schmidt.

In 1920 came the launch of Germany's first radio transmitter, the Transmitter Königs Wusterhausen, and in 1935, Königs Wusterhausen was raised to town status. In 1937, Saint Elisabeth's Catholic Church was built and consecrated.

In 1938, the Berlin Autobahn ringroad – now Bundesautobahn 10 – was dedicated, and now serves cities and towns around Berlin, including Königs Wusterhausen. By now, the National Socialists were in power, and in 1944 they built a concentration camp for Jews and Poles at the railway goods station.

After the Second World War and until 1990, Königs Wusterhausen was in East Germany.

In 1972, Germany's deadliest ever aviation accident occurred when an Interflug passenger flight crashed near Königs Wusterhausen, killing 156 people. 1972 also saw the collapse of Königs Wusterhausen's Central tower, which at 243 m tall was the most prominent structure at the radio transmission facility.

Worship

Christianity
In Königs Wusterhausen, there is a Catholic parish as well as congregations of the Protestant church body named Evangelical Church of Berlin-Brandenburg-Silesian Upper Lusatia. The oldest church in town is the village Wehrkirche (a church whose architecture contains typically military elements) in Deutsch Wusterhausen, built in the 13th century. In 1998 the Evangelical Königs Wusterhausen deanery merged in the Berlin-Neukölln deanery. The Protestant congregations in Königs Wusterhausen (KW), Deutsch Wusterhausen, Niederlehme, Senzig, Zeesen, and Zernsdorf (all components of KW) as well as that in Schenkendorf (a component of Mittenwalde), today make up the ecclesiastical Region 9.

The Catholic parish belongs to the Deanship of Köpenick-Treptow of the Archdiocese of Berlin.

Both communities have very active youth groups, the Evangelical Junge Gemeinde ("Young Community") and the Katholische Jugend ("Catholic Youth").

In January 2013, the Freie Baptistengemeinde Königs Wusterhausen was organized. They are located near the post office and hold weekly services as well as other Bible studies including "Jungschar" and a monthly "Jugendtreff".

Politics

City council
Königs Wusterhausen's town council consists of 36 councillors, with the mayor (Bürgermeister) as head. According to the results of the latest local election in May 2019, they were apportioned as follows:

Social Democratic Party (SPD) – 8 seats
Christian Democratic Union (CDU) – 5 seats
Alternative for Germany (AfD) – 5 seats
The Left (Linke) – 5 seats
Free Voters (citizens' coalition) (FWKW) – 4 seats
Wir für KW (WfKW) – 3 seats
Alliance 90/The Greens – 3 seats
Free Democratic Party (FDP) – 1
Other – 4 seats

Twin towns – sister cities

Königs Wusterhausen is twinned with:
 Příbram, Czech Republic
 Germantown, United States
 Hückeswagen, Germany
 Steglitz-Zehlendorf (Berlin), Germany

Culture and sightseeing

Buildings

Königs Wusterhausen Hunting Lodge and Garden, known as Prussian King Frederick William favourite place to stay.
Kreuzkirche ("Cross Church"), begun in 1693, new glazing in 1949 with 3 choir windows and 4 ornamental round panes by Charles Crodel.
Neue Mühle ("New Mill") Canal lock (first documented in 1739), difference in levels: 1.50 m
Watertower (begun 1910, shut down 1965), now a café with beergarden and exhibition areas
210-metre transmission mast (built 1925)

Museums
Königs Wusterhausen Transmission and Radio Technology Museum on the Funkerberg

Of the once great number of building works on the Funkerberg ("Transmitter Mountain"), only very little is preserved nowadays, as many transmission towers were dismantled for technical reasons after the Central Tower collapsed and fell on 15 November 1972. Today, only a 210-m-high mast and two small freestanding towers are to be found there. Along with the remaining buildings, this forms a technological monument.

Until 1999 this mast bore the transmitting antenna that served as the reserve antenna for the longwave stations at Zehlendorf bei Oranienburg and Donebach.

In 1994, a 67-m-high precast concrete cellular transmission tower was put up. It is today the only active transmitter on the Funkerberg.

The first attempts at transmissions were in 1908. On 22 December 1920, music and speech were transmitted wirelessly from the Funkerberg for the first time on "Welle 2400" – longwave. It went down in history as the German postal system's Christmas concert. Königs Wusterhausen is thus also said to be the cradle of German radio. The artists in that broadcast were, incidentally, postal employees. The initiative was German radio pioneer Hans Bredow's brainchild (for this and other groundbreaking work, he is considered the "Father of German Radio").

Until 1926, the popular Sonntagskonzerte ("Sunday Concerts") were broadcast. The station's studio was in the beginning a remodelled bathroom at the first broadcasting house on the Funkerberg.

Economy and infrastructure

Transport
Railway (Königs Wusterhausen regional trains (RE2 RB22, 24, 36) and S-Bahn •S46 to Westkreuz• station)
Autobahns/ Freeways: A 10 (Berliner Ring), A 13
Highways: Bundesstraße (Federal highway) 179 (B 179)
Air travel: Berlin-Brandenburg International Airport (BER)
Waterways: Königs Wusterhausen inland port.

Notable people
Heinrich Mederow (born 1945), rower, bronze medalist at the 1972 Olympics
Marek Kalbus (born 1969), opera and concert singer
Sandra Keller (born 1973), actress
Mike Jesse (born 1973), footballer
Sabine Jünger (born 1973), politician (The Left)
Judith Arndt (born 1976), cyclist

References

External links

City of Königs Wusterhausen
Friends of the Königs Wusterhausen transmitter
Schloss Königs Wusterhausen
Map of Königs Wusterhausen
Catholic Youth
Evangelical Young Community
 

Localities in Dahme-Spreewald
Teltow (region)
Holocaust locations in Germany